Tuning Fork is a 1979 Soviet two-part television feature film. The film uses drawings by Nadya Rusheva. Alexander Gradsky appears in the film as himself. The song from the film 'Baby', performed by Gradsky, became popular for playing in the yards with a guitar.

Plot 
The characters in the film are ninth-grade students. The film tells about the problems of raising teenagers in the family and in school; assessment by teachers of students as individuals; rivalry in the class for leadership; purity and morality of people. The film also touches on the complexity of growing up and first love.

Cast 

 Elena Shanina  - Claudia Sergeevna, class teacher
 Boris Saburov  - Grigory Sidorovich, teacher
 Andrey Tashkov  - Lyosha Kuzmin
 Irina Korytnikova  - Tanya Sevastyanova, headman
 Vasily Funtikov  - Sasha Ganushkin
 Anna Nadtochiy  - Vera Mikhailova (voiced by Natalya Rychagova )
 Artur Sirotinsky  - Petya Yankovsky
 Polina Kachura - Lara Belykh
 Evgeny Ivanychev  as Fedor Petrovich, Lara's father
 Sergei Sazontiev  - Yuri Vasilyevich Reshetnikov, director of the film studio
 Luciena Ovchinnikova  as Maria Fedorovna, Galushkin's mother
 G. Potykalov - Kolya Kuskov
 Alexander Gradsky  - cameo

Awards 
X-th film festival 'Youth' (1979) - Prize of the magazine 'News of the cinema screens' went to the actor A. Tashkov.

Other sources 

 Tuning fork // Television feature films for children and fairy tale films: an annotated catalogue.  - M .: Gosteleradiofond, 2002. - 231 p. - page 62
 Tuning fork // Mastery in the film: Sat. articles about Ukrainian cinema in 1976-1980. / Comp. A. I. Shcherbak. - Kiev: Mystetstvo, 1982. - 247 p. - page 234

References 

1979 television films
Russian television films
1979 films